Velangi is a village in the Godavari River delta, about 18 km South West of Kakinada in the State of Andhra Pradesh, India.

Location
The village is in between Kakinada (north) and Ramachandrapuram (south). Some of the other villages around Velangi are Kurada,  Siripuram,Endamuru,Mamidada,Chinna Kothauru,Peddakotthuru.

Banks
Andhra Bank
State Bank of India

Transportation
It is accessible by bus from Kakinada or Ramachandrapuram from where one can take a local bus (40 minutes) or taxi (25 minutes) or an auto-riksha (40 minutes).

Velangi is on the Kakinada-Kotipalli railway line, and has a station. The nearest major railway station is in Kakinada  (19 km) and the nearest railway junction is Samalkot. For both the stations there are frequent trains to / from Visakhapatnam and Vijayawada.

The nearest airport is in  Rajahmundry or Madhurapudi, 62 km away, the nearest international airport is at Visakhapatnam.

Geography

Educational Institutes
It has a one Elementary School and High School known as Merla Zilla Parishad Primary Upper Primary School, and Junior college,
Bhanu Prakash Convent.

Features
The village in known for its progressive farmers and the main occupation of residents is farming. It is surrounded by paddy fields irrigated by canals from the Godavari River. Rice is the major economic crop in the area.

Ancient temples of Draksharamam, Kotipalli, and Dwarapudi are close by. The village is also known for good cooks and cracker manufacturing.

Festivals
Velangi is famous for its festivals (Mari Amma Jatra, Elephant Festival & Navarathri Festival) and melas that occur in every year. The Village deity is Mari Amma Talli, Pallla Allam Talli (sister of Mari Amma) Gonthallamma Talli, Dhan Amma Talli, and Sati Amma Talli.

Mari Amma Talli (Temple in Kotha Peta, Phittapuram Maharaja donated Innam Land to Potters, Dobhis, and Madigas to conduct a Jathra) 
Pallla Allam Talli 
Gonthallamma Talli 
Dhan Amma Talli 
Sati Amma Talli

References

External links
Map Link: 
 
 

Villages in East Godavari district